Curry is an unincorporated community in Talladega County, Alabama, United States, located on Alabama State Route 21,  northeast of Talladega.

References

Unincorporated communities in Talladega County, Alabama
Unincorporated communities in Alabama